For the Sake of Elena is a crime novel by Elizabeth George.

References 

1992 American novels
American mystery novels
Bantam Books books